The Network of European Regions Using Space Technologies or NEREUS is an international non-profit association. It was created in April 2008 and established under Belgian law. Its registered office is in Brussels, Belgium. The objective of NEREUS is to explore the benefits of space technologies for the European Regions and their citizens, and contribute to spread their applications.

NEREUS is financially independent and only funded by the yearly membership fees of its members. There are two possible memberships: Full member (European Regions) and Associate Member (companies, universities and other organisations).

Full Members
The following European Regions are Full Members of NEREUS:

:
Walloon Region
:
Aquitaine
Brittany
French Guiana
Midi-Pyrénées
Provence-Alpes-Côte d'Azur
:
Baden-Württemberg
Bavaria
Brandenburg
Free Hanseatic City of Bremen
Hesse
:
Abruzzo
Apulia
Basilicata
Lazio
Lombardia
Tuscany
Veneto

:
Province of South Holland
:
Mazowieckie Voivodeship
:
Azores
:
Andalusia
Region of Madrid
:
East Midlands

Associate Members

The following organisations are Associate Members of NEREUS:

AIPAS - Associazione delle Imprese per le Attività Spaziali
Airbus Defence and Space
ALTEC S.p.A. - Advanced Logistics Technology Engineering Center
Compagnia Generale per lo Spazio CGS S.p.A.
CEREMA - Centre d’études et d’expertise sur les risques, l’environnement, la mobilité et l’aménagement
CNES - Centre national d'études spatiales
CVARG - Centro de Vulcanologia e Avaliação de Riscos Geológicos
CISAS - Centro di Ateneo di Studi e Attività Spaziali "Giuseppe Colombo"
Chambre de Commerce et d'Industrie du Gers
Cité de l'espace
CORILA - Consorzio per il coordinamento delle ricerche inerenti al sistema lagunare di Venezia
Consorzio TERN - Technologies for Earth Observation and Natural Risks
EDISOFT SA
EURAC - European Academy of Bolzano/Bozen
EUTELSAT
FADOT - Fundación Aragonesa para el Desarrollo de la Observación de la Tierra
FFG
GeoVille GmbH
GIS Bretagne Télédétection                       
IREA CNR U.O.S. Milano
Interbalkan Environment Center, i-BEC
Italian Cluster for Aerospace Technologies
Network della meccanica molfettese, NE.MO
OMP - Observatoire Midi-Pyrénées
Pôle Mer Bretagne
Politecnico di Milano B.E.S.T. Department
Politecnico di Torino
SAM - Società Aerospaziale Mediterranea
Selex Galileo
SES S.A.   
AEIT - Asociación Española de Ingenieros de Telecomunicación
STAE Toulouse - Sciences et Technologies pour l'Aéronautique et l'Espace
Technapoli
Telespazio France
TéSA Laboratory
Thales Alenia Space
Toscana Spazio
T.R.E. s.r.l.
University of Turin

Working Groups
The Working Groups were created in March 2009. They include the main fields of cooperation of the NEREUS Political Charter and focus on the applications of several space-related concepts. The following Working Groups exist within NEREUS:
Earth Observation/Copernicus WG
Global Navigation Satellite Systems (GNSS) WG
Telecommunication WG
Technologies from Space Exploration WG
Communication, Education and Training (CET) WG
Clusters WG

Projects
The following projects are currently being carried out by NEREUS:
THE ISSUE - Traffic- Health- Environment-Intelligent  Solutions Sustaining Urban Economies
FORMAT-EO - FORmation of Multi-disciplinary Approaches to Training in Earth Observation. It is an Erasmus master-level summer school on Earth Observation.

NEREUS is also involved in some projects being carried out by its partners:
SABER - Satellite Broadband for European Regions - Thematic Network
BRESAT - Broadband in EU Regions via Satellite
ISTIMES - Integrated System for Transport Infrastructures surveillance and Monitoring by Electromagnetic Sensing
SHIRA - Satellite for High resolution Infrared Application
STEPS - Systems and Technologies for Space Exploration – Piedmontese Aerospace Platform
Territorial satellite technologies: the NEREUS network's Italian experiences - Study of the Italian regions

References

External links
Official Website

International organisations based in Belgium
Space organizations
Organizations established in 2008